Franklin Zham Culver (April 24, 1897 – January 13, 1969) was a professional football player who played three seasons in the National Football League, with the Buffalo All-Americans, Rochester Jeffersons, Buffalo Bisons and the Canton Bulldogs. He played from the 1923 season through the 1925 season. Culver's Bisons teammate, Jim Ailinger called Culver "a pretty damn good center" in an interview before his death on March 27, 2001.

Prior to playing in the NFL, Culver played college football at Syracuse. In 1922 he was named the team's captain. Culver was a three-time letterman, in 1920, 1921 and 1922.

References

1897 births
1969 deaths
American football centers
American football ends
Buffalo All-Americans players
Buffalo Bisons (NFL) players
Canton Bulldogs players
Rochester Jeffersons players
Syracuse Orange football players
Sportspeople from Toledo, Ohio
Players of American football from Ohio